Imre Lestyan (born 24 October 1963) is a Romanian biathlete. He competed in the 20 km individual event at the 1984 Winter Olympics.

References

External links
 

1963 births
Living people
Romanian male biathletes
Olympic biathletes of Romania
Biathletes at the 1984 Winter Olympics
Sportspeople from Târgu Mureș